R97 may refer to:
 
 
 , a destroyer of the Royal Navy
 , an aircraft carrier ordered for the Royal Navy but never completed